Water skiing competitions at the 2015 Pan American Games in Toronto will be held from July 20 to 23 at the Ontario Place West Channel. The competition was split into two disciplines, water skiing and wakeboarding. Men and women will contest the water skiing events (four each in total) and the wakeboard board competition is only open to men. Therefore, there will be a total of nine medal events in the sport.

Competition schedule

The following is the competition schedule for the water skiing competitions:

Medal table

Medalists

Men's events

Women's events

Participating nations
A total of 12 countries have qualified athletes. The number of athletes a nation has entered is in parentheses beside the name of the country.

Qualification

A total of 40 athletes will qualify to compete at the games. The top 8 nations (including the host nation, Canada) at the 2014 Pan American Championship, will each receive four athlete quotas in water skiing. A further 8 spots are made available for wakeboard qualifiers. A nation may enter a maximum of three athletes in each gender in the water skiing competition.

References

 
Events at the 2015 Pan American Games
2015